Jorgen Hus (born September 12, 1989) is a professional Canadian football longsnapper for the Saskatchewan Roughriders of the Canadian Football League (CFL). He was drafted in the fourth round, 31st overall by the Edmonton Eskimos in the 2013 CFL Draft. He spent time with the National Football League's St. Louis Rams, Seattle Seahawks, and Kansas City Chiefs from 2013 to 2014. His CFL rights were traded to the Roughriders for Cory Watson on May 11, 2015 and he signed with the Roughriders on May 21, 2015. He played in his first professional game on June 27, 2015 against the Winnipeg Blue Bombers. Hus played CIS football for the Regina Rams and also played junior football for the Saskatoon Hilltops.

Hus re-signed to a one-year contract extension with the Roughriders on December 16, 2020.

References

External links
Saskatchewan Roughriders bio 

1989 births
Living people
Canadian football long snappers
American football long snappers
Players of Canadian football from Saskatchewan
Saskatchewan Huskies football players
Saskatchewan Roughriders players
Sportspeople from Saskatoon
St. Louis Rams players
Seattle Seahawks players
Kansas City Chiefs players